Georg Seelig is a Swiss computer scientist, bioengineer, and synthetic biologist. He is an Associate Professor of Electrical Engineering and Computer Science & Engineering at the University of Washington. He is a researcher in the field of DNA nanotechnology.

Life
He graduated from University of Basel with a Diploma in Physics in 1998 and did his PhD on condensed matter Physics from University of Geneva in 2003. He was a post doctoral associate in the lab of Professor Erik Winfree at California Institute of Technology between 2003 and 2009 
. He has won the prestigious NSF CAREER award in 2010, the Alfred P. Sloan Research Fellowship in 2011, and the DARPA Young Faculty Award in 2012. He is a part of the Molecular Programming Project.

References

University of Washington faculty
Living people
Swiss computer scientists
Swiss biologists
University of Basel alumni
University of Geneva alumni
Synthetic biologists
DNA nanotechnology people
Year of birth missing (living people)